The Norwegian Agency for Development Cooperation (Norad) is a directorate under the Norwegian Ministry of Foreign Affairs. In matters regarding Norway's International Climate and Forest Initiative (NICFI), Norad reports to the Norwegian Ministry of Climate and Environment.

Norad's functions are laid down in the agency's terms of references and annual letters of allocation issued by the Ministry of Foreign Affairs and the Ministry of Climate and Environment.

Norad works to ensure effective foreign aid, with quality assurance and evaluation. Norad finances NGOs and does its own research and projects. The current director general is Bård Vegar Solhjell. Norad used to be the official development assistance organization in Norway. As of mid-2004, the responsibility for state-to-state official development assistance has been transferred to the Norwegian Ministry of Foreign Affairs, while Norad continues to fund NGO activities in developing countries (particularly through its NORHED program), and contributes to the management of development funds while ensuring that Norwegian development cooperation is accurately evaluated and efficiently implemented.

Organization 
Norad consists of the following departments:

 Director General's Office
 Department for Climate, Energy, Environment and Research
 Department for Education and Global Health
 Department for Economic Development, Gender and Governance 
 Civil Society Department
 Department for Quality Assurance
 Department for Communication
 Department of Human Resources and Administration
 Evaluation Department

Finances
Norway granted NOK 36.6 billion in development assistance in 2016, corresponding to 1.11 per cent of Norway's gross national income (GNI).

According to the OECD, 2020 official development assistance from Norway increased 8.4% to USD 4.2 billion.

Employees
 Director General, Bård Vegar Solhjell
 Director of Communications, Eva Bratholm

References

External links
 Agency official homepage

International development agencies
Foreign relations of Norway
Development Cooperation
1968 establishments in Norway
Government agencies established in 1968